What Every Girl Should Know is a 1927 American silent romance film directed by Charles Reisner and starring Patsy Ruth Miller, Ian Keith, Carroll Nye, Mickey McBan, Lillian Langdon, and Hazel Howell. Written by Lois Jackson, the film was released by Warner Bros. on March 20, 1927.

Cast       
Patsy Ruth Miller as Mary Sullivan
Ian Keith as Arthur Graham
Carroll Nye as Dave Sullivan
Mickey McBan as Bobby Sullivan
Lillian Langdon as Mrs. Randolph
Hazel Howell as Estelle Randolph
Carmelita Geraghty as Madame Le Fleur

Preservation
With no copies listed in any film archives, What Every Girl Should Know is a lost film.

References

External links

1927 films
American romance films
1920s romance films
Warner Bros. films
Films directed by Charles Reisner
American silent feature films
American black-and-white films
1920s English-language films
1920s American films